Sally Johnston (born Invercargill, New Zealand) is a competitive sport shooter from New Zealand.  She started shooting in 1983 with her first international competition in 1995 at the Oceania Championships in Auckland. Johnston placed eighth in the 50m rifle three positions and ninth in the 10m air rifle. In 1997 she beat her personal bests in all three events at the Oceania Championships in Adelaide where she placed fourth in the 50m rifle prone, tenth in the 10m air rifle and eleventh in 50m rifle three positions event.

At the 1998 Commonwealth Games in Kuala Lumpur, Johnston won the bronze medal in the women's 50m prone event. At the 2006 Commonwealth Games in Melbourne she finished fifth and at the 2010 Commonwealth Games she finished seventh.

She won the gold medal in the same event at the 2014 Commonwealth Games in Glasgow, winning by 0.6 of a point. She shot a games record of 620.7 to narrowly beat South Africa's Esmari van Reenen.

Since 2007, Johnston has trained and competed whilst working full-time at the Ministry for Primary Industries in Wellington.  She has worked in the role of Manager for Food and Beverage since 2014.

References

Living people
New Zealand female sport shooters
Commonwealth Games bronze medallists for New Zealand
Commonwealth Games gold medallists for New Zealand
Shooters at the 1998 Commonwealth Games
Shooters at the 2006 Commonwealth Games
Shooters at the 2010 Commonwealth Games
Shooters at the 2014 Commonwealth Games
Commonwealth Games medallists in shooting
Year of birth missing (living people)
Medallists at the 1998 Commonwealth Games
Medallists at the 2014 Commonwealth Games